Pa amb tomàquet ("Bread with tomato"), is a traditional food of Catalan, Aragonese and Balearic cuisine. Pa amb tomàquet is considered a staple of Catalan cuisine and identity. While considered a signature toast dish in the Catalan Countries, it is common in bars throughout the rest of Spain, where it is also known as pan tumaca.

It consists of bread, which may or may not be toasted, with tomato rubbed over and seasoned with olive oil and salt.

It is considered one of the typical examples that define the Mediterranean diet, extended as a traditional recipe throughout the Catalan Countries.
 
It is popularly consumed on its own as a snack or a tapa with any meal, from breakfast to dinner.

Preparation

In some Catalan restaurants, the tomato mixture is pre-made and is brushed on the bread, while others provide the guests with the ingredients to do the work themselves. The dish is served accompanied with any sorts of sausages (cured botifarres, xoriço, fuet, Iberian ham, etc.), ham, cheeses, omelettes, anchovies or other marinated fish, or grilled vegetables like escalivada.

In Majorca, pa amb oli is prepared with  tomato called Tomàtiga de Ramellet, a specific variety of tomatoes on the vine, smaller and with a taste that is slightly more intense and sour than normal tomatoes because of the loss of acidity in the tomato.

The original base used to be made with toasted slices of pa de pagès ("peasants' bread"), a typical round loaf of wheat bread of a fair size (from 500 g to 5 kg, from some 20 cm to 50 cm in diameter).

If the mixture is not premade, there is said to be an ideal order in which the ingredients are integrated to yield the best flavour. First, if used, the garlic is rubbed on the bread.  Then the same is done with the tomato.  Next comes the salt, and lastly the olive oil.

History
The origin of this dish is disputed, as tomato is relatively new to Catalan cuisine (it came from America only after the 15th century). Widely regarded as the epitome of Catalan cuisine and identity, some sources claim it is actually a relatively recent (mid to late 19th century) in all the Mediterranean coast of Spain.

Catalan chef Josep Lladonosa i Giró says it was first documented in the 18th century. The cook, born in 1938, remembers his grandmother explaining that her parents used to eat a dish called pa amb tomàquet. With better precision, Catalan cooking historian Nèstor Luján says that the first written reference is from 1884 and, according to his thesis, the recipe would have been created in the rural world during an abundant tomato harvest.  People would have used the tomatoes to soften hard and dry bread.

The dish shares some similarities with the tomato and olive oil-rubbed ħobż biz-Zejt of Malta, with the pan-bagnat of Nice, in the Provence region of France, the tomato-topped version of Italian bruschetta.

Gallery

See also

 Bruschetta
 List of bread dishes
 List of toast dishes

References

External links 

 Pa amb tomaquet Group on Flickr
 

Catalan cuisine
Toast dishes